Derek Roland Clark (10 October 1933 - 1 January 2023) was a former UK Independence Party politician.  He was a Member of the European Parliament (MEP) for the East Midlands from 2004 to 2014.

He stood as a UKIP candidate in the 2010 general election for Northampton South, receiving 1,897 votes (4.9%), which was 50 votes short of retaining his deposit.

He was educated at the University of Bristol (Teaching Certificate) and the University of Exeter. He was a retired science teacher.

In 2011, he was investigated by OLAF, the EU anti-fraud office, and was made to repay £31,800 for wages paid to employees who were working for UKIP and not for his EU Parliament work.

Clark was a climate change denier and pledged to ban the teaching of anthropogenic global warming in schools.

References

External links

Profile on European Parliament website
Report on OLAF decision

1933 births
Alumni of the University of Bristol
Alumni of the University of Exeter
UK Independence Party parliamentary candidates
Politics of Lincolnshire
UK Independence Party MEPs
MEPs for England 2004–2009
MEPs for England 2009–2014